Durga Dass is an Indian politician and member of the Jammu and Kashmir National Panthers Party. Dass was a member of the Jammu and Kashmir Legislative Assembly from the Hiranagar constituency in Kathua district.

References 

People from Kathua district
Bharatiya Janata Party politicians from Jammu and Kashmir
Jammu and Kashmir MLAs 2008–2014
Living people
21st-century Indian politicians
Jammu and Kashmir National Panthers Party politicians
Year of birth missing (living people)